Bombus steindachneri is a species of bumblebee. It is endemic to Mexico.

This bee lives in pine-oak forests, thorn forest, and tropical dry forest habitat. It occurs at sea level to elevations around 2600 meters. It is active year-round.

This is an endangered species on the IUCN Red List. Threats include habitat loss to agriculture, including cattle ranching, and associated chemical use. It is also impacted by urbanization, mining, and loss of the native flora.

References

External links
Moure, J. S. & G. Melo. 2012. Bombus steindachneri. Catalogue of Bees (Hymenoptera, Apoidea) in the Neotropical Region - online version.

Bumblebees
Endemic insects of Mexico
Insects described in 1888